A calyptra is a feature of plant formation. Calyptra  may also refer to:

 Calyptra (moth), a moth genus in the family Erebidae
 Calyptra (fungus), a genus of fungi in the class Dothideomycetes